Tales from the B-Side is a collection of B-sides from American hardcore punk band Biohazard.

Track listing

References

Biohazard (band) albums
B-side compilation albums
2001 compilation albums